Orso is the Italian word meaning "bear", and is a common given name and surname in Italy.

Orso may refer to:

People
 Given name
Orso of Benevento (died 892), Prince of Benevento
Orso Ipato, Doge of Venice, 726–737
Orso I Participazio (died 881), Doge of Venice
Orso II Participazio (died 932), Doge of Venice, 912–932
Orso Maria Guerrini (born 1943), Italian actor
Orso Mario Corbino (1876–1937), Italian physicist and politician

 Surname
Anna Orso (1938–2012), Italian actress
Michel Orso (born 1936), French singer-songwriter
Mike D'Orso (born 1953), American journalist

Other
Örsö, an island in the Stockholm archipelago, Sweden
Orso (band), a US-based band
Sant'Orso, name in Italian of the Collegiate church of Saint Ursus in Aosta, Italy

See also
Edda Dell'Orso (born 1935), Italian singer
L'orso bruno, a 1975 album by Antonello Venditti
Surnames from nicknames
Italian-language surnames
Given names